The Kedah Supreme Order of Merit (Bahasa Melayu: Darjah Utama Untok Jasa Kedah) is an honorific order of the Sultanate of Kedah

History 
It was founded by Sultan Badlishah of Kedah on 17 November 1953 (or 30 October 1952).

Award conditions 
This is the highest Order to be conferred on those who have performed meritorious deeds with full responsibility to the nation for a stated number of years. It is conferred on those of high position and wide influence. This Order may be held by only three living persons at one time, and it is seldom conferred.

Classes 
It is awarded in one class:  
  Darjah Utama Untok Jasa Kedah - DUK

Recipients 
 Tunku Abdul Rahman

Insignia 
The Order consists of a chain. Photos : Kedah

References 

Merit